Labhpur is a census town in Labpur CD block in Bolpur subdivision of Birbhum district in the Indian state of West Bengal. It is known to the outside world as the native place of Tarashankar Bandopadhyay and one of the 51 Shakti Peethas.

Geography

Location

Note: The map alongside presents some of the notable locations in the area. All places marked in the map are linked in the larger full screen map.

It lies in the flood plains of Mayurakshi River and when water is released from Massanjore dam and Tilpara barrage in large quantities, flood waters wreak havoc in the area. In 2006, nearly 50,000 people were marooned in Labhpur and surrounding blocks of Birbhum district.

Police station 
Labhpur police station has jurisdiction over Labhpur CD block.

CD block HQ 
The headquarters of Labpur CD block are located at Labhpur.

Panchayat
1. labpur 1 no gram panchayat

2. labpur 2 no gram panchayat

Demographics 
As per the 2011 Census of India, Labhpur had a total population of 5,419 of which 2,762 (51%) were males and 2,657 (49%) were females. Population below 6 years was 443. The total number of literates in Labhpur was 4,193 (84.26% of the population over 6 years).

Infrastructure
As per the District Census Handbook 2011, Labhpur covered an area of 2.1069 km2. There is a railway station at Labhpur . Buses are available in the town. It has 5 km roads and open drains. The major source of protected water supply is from bore well pumping and over head tank. There are 1,000 domestic electric connections. Amongst the medical facilities it has 16 medicine shops. Amongst the educational facilities it has are 5 primary schools, 2 middle schools, 2 secondary schools and 2 senior secondary schools. Amongst the social, recreational and cultural facilities there are 1 cinema theatre, 1 auditorium/ community hall, 1 public library and 1 reading room. It has the branches of 4 nationalised banks, 1 cooperative bank and 1 agricultural credit society. Amongst the commodities it produces are paddy, wheat and oil seeds.

Economics 
Traditionally, there used to be a weekly market, locally called hat. Apart from vegetables, such needs as pottery, wooden materials, iron materials, baskets, seeds etc. were available.
But at present the economy of Labpur is changed. There are 4 main market 1.Old busstand market, 2.BDO complex, 3. Sastinagar market & 4. Hattala. Labpur is also important for the villages situated near Labpur.

Transport 

It is located on the Suri–Phutishanko (state highway 6) road and Labhpur railway station is situated about 12 km from Ahmedpur and 11 km from Kirnahar on the Ahmedpur Katwa Railway.

One pair of trains ran daily along the 52 km Ahmedpur – Katwa narrow gauge (2' 6") line. It remained a single line since its inception. Indian Railways took over the narrow gauge tracks between Katwa and Ahmedpur, and Katwa and Bardhaman from McLoyd and Company in 1966. The railways have identified poor turnout of passengers and their unwillingness to buy tickets as the reasons behind the losses incurred by the narrow gauge section. Since 16 January 2013 the train services had been stopped and the work of conversion of the narrow-gauge line was going on. Conversion work was completed in early 2017 and the section has been opened to passenger traffic since 24 May 2018.

The bus terminal is very near of Labpur Sambhunath College & Block Development office. Labpur is well connected by bus routes with Siuri, Sainthia, Rampurhat, Bolpur, Kirnahar and other important parts of the district. It is also connected with Burdwan, Durgapur, Asansol, Berhampur, Katwa, Krishnanagar by frequent bus service.

Education 

College
 Sambhunath College, Labpur. (Estd. 1963)
 Labpur Teachers' Training Institute (B.Ed)
 Labpur Teachers' Training Institute (D.El.Ed)
High School
 Labpur Jadablal High School(H.S.) (Estd. 1901)
 Satyanarayan Shikshaniketan Girls' High School(H.S.) (Estd. 1958)
 Jawahar Navodaya Vidyalaya(CBSE) at Gopalpur. (Estd. 2007)
 St. Josheph's Convent School(ICSE) at Laghata. (Estd. 2005)
 Jakir Hossain Minority Educational Society (CBSE)
 Labpur Jr. High Madrasha. (Estd. 1977)
 Laghata Jr. High School. (Estd. 2011)
Primary School
 Nirmalshib Junior Basic School. (Estd. 1951)
 Jagadamba Junior Basic School. (Estd. 1946)
 Sandipan Pathshala. (Estd. 1983)
 Sambhu Mukherjee Smriti Prathamik Bidyalaya. (Estd. 1999)
 Laghata Santal Primary School.
 Bisweshwari Smriti Sishu Siksha Mandir. (Estd. 1977)
 Ramkrishna Vivekananda Vidyashram. (Estd. 2000)
 Bhaswati Vidyapith. (Estd. 2005)
Sambhunath College: The college was established in 1963. It was named after Sambhunath Bandyopadhyay, the ex-Vice Chancellor of Calcutta University and justice of Calcutta High Court. The land was donated by the Bandyopadhyay(ex-Jamindars) family of Labpur and by Md. Kashem Mullick. The college was re-opened on 1 July 1973 after a period of closure since 1968. Sambhunath Bandyopadhyay, Sudhiranjan Das( VC of Viswa Bharati), Dr.D.M. Sen, Dr.Srikumar Bandyopadhyay, Dr.Satkari Mukhopadhyay, Dr.S.N.Mukherjee, Dr.Ramaranjan Mukhopadhyay, Sri Satya Narayan Bandyopadhyay, #Dr.K.D.Roy (first principal of the college) and many other eminent persons were present in the inaugural meeting on 16 August 1963.
The chair of the President of governing body of this College was honored by renowned persons like Sambhunath Bandyopadhyay, Somnath Chattopadhyay (ex-Speaker of Loksabha) and Pranab Mukherjee(ex President of India).

Culture

Tarashankar country 
Tarashankar Bandopadhyay, the Bengali writer, was born at Labhpur on 23 July 1898. He passed matriculation from Labhpur in 1916. Many of his novels and stories carry vivid descriptions of the area.

In the novel Hansulibanker Upkatha, he writes, "The Hansulibank countryside is somewhat rough land. Here, man’s fight is more with land, than that with rivers. When drought comes, in extreme summer, the river becomes a desert, it is a land of sand – only deep water somehow manages to weave a narrow way through it. The land then is transformed into rock. The grass dries up. The land heats up as if it is a piece of heated-up iron."

In his novel Ganadevata, he quotes a rural rhyme
 Poush-Poush, golden Poush,
Come Poush but don’t go away, don’t ever leave,
Don’t leave Poush, Don’t,
The husband and son will eat a full bowl of rice.

Labpur Atulshiv Club, Birbhum Sangskriti Bahini and Dishari Sangskritik Chakra are among the renowned cultural organisations in Labhpur. Besides other cultural activities, these organisations stages dramas regularly in and outside Labhpur.

Festivals 
The most important festival of Labhpur is Durga Puja, followed by Jagdahatri Puja and Rash Yatra. The Banerjee Family celebrates the Jagadhatri Puja with the same festivity since last 200 years.On the day of Rash Yatra (a couple of days after the Jagadhatri Puja), a procession goes from the Thakur Badi to the Rath Tala. There, the annual feast of Krishna is celebrated. Another great festival of this region is the Fullara Mela (fair), which is held on the first full moon of Bengali month of Magh. The annual celebration of Laxmi Puja, Kali Puja and the Village Goddess Maa Rakhkha Kali are also celebrated. The Mahashivratri festival is observed by worshipping Shiva and holding fasts. The Prominent clubs celebrating Durga Puja include: 1. Pallisamaj. 2. Bright Star Club. 3. Atul Shiv Club 4.Sasthinagar Young Society. The Tran Samiti club celebrates Kali Puja. Sasthinagar Young Society also celebrates Kali puja. Muslim festivals (like Yeed-ul-jjua, Maharam etc.)are also celebrated in Labpur.

Nearby places

Fullara 

According to mythology, when Mahadeva danced around with Sati's dead body cutting it to pieces, the lip fell at Fullara. There is a big pond beside the temple. According to hearsay, Hanuman collected 108 blue lotuses from the pond when Sri Ramachandra required them for the worship of goddess Durga. It is considered to be one of the fifty-one shakti peethas in India.

The Jagadharti Mandir of Banerjee Family in Babu Para 
It is a very famous Temple in Labpur. It is a very old Puja that till continued.

Bele 
There is a pond whose waters are popularly believed to have the powers to heal arthritis.

Gobinda Sagar 
This is actually a part of Laghata River dissected off earlier. From this pond once, a statue of Lord Sri Krishna was found.

Thakur Badi 
This is an ancient Temple decorated with precious marble stones, about 1 km from the station. This temple was founded by Satyanarayana Banerjee. Here, several idols of Gods are present, including those of Lord Sri Krishna, Lord Ganesha and Lord Karthik. The famous Rash Yatra is celebrated here with great ceremonies and rituals.

The Sadars 
There are four groups of Temples at Labpur, which are popularly known as "Sadars". The temples usually are centering the four ancient shrines to Goddess Durga. These are:
1. Kulin Para, the group belonging to the Chattopadhay family.
2. Nicher Sadar, the group belonging to the Bandopadhay family.
3. Upaar Sadar, the group belonging to the Sarkar and Chattopadhay families.
4. Mukhopadhyay family,popularly known as mukujje family of labhpur
 5.Dutta Pada, the group belonging to the Dutta family.
All these temples are enriched with inner-temples to Lord Shiva. The four families were once the Zamindar or Landlord of Labhpur, who wished to be remembered by erecting these temples.

Healthcare 
Labpur Rural Hospital at Labhpur has 30 beds.

See also

References 

Cities and towns in Birbhum district